The Doichang frog (Nanorana aenea) is a species of frog in the family Dicroglossidae. It is only known from its type locality, Doi Chang, mountain north of Chiang Mai (Thailand), Fansipan mountain in northern Vietnam (type locality for the now-synonymized Rana fansipani), and Huanglianshan National Nature Reserve in Yunnan, China.

Description

Habitat and conservation
Its natural habitats are subtropical or tropical moist montane forest and rivers. It is potentially threatened by habitat loss, more so in Vietnam than in Thailand. In Vietnam it is probably eaten locally.

References

Nanorana
Amphibians of China
Amphibians of Thailand
Amphibians of Vietnam
Taxa named by Malcolm Arthur Smith
Amphibians described in 1922
Taxonomy articles created by Polbot